Form F-4 is an American Form used to register securities in connection with business combinations and exchange offers involving foreign private issuers. These activities include mergers & acquisitions, going-private transactions, rights offerings, and other similar deals conducted by foreign entities.

Resources
 SEC Homepage

SEC filings